The Klon Centaur is an overdrive pedal made by the American engineer Bill Finnegan between 1994 and 2008. Finnegan hoped to create a pedal that would recreate the harmonically rich distortion of a guitar amplifier at a high volume.

Finnegan struggled to meet demand, and used units sold for inflated prices. Only around 8,000 were built. He discontinued the Centaur in 2008 and redesigned it as the Klon KTR, which is simpler to manufacture by contracted firms. The Centaur has inspired numerous clones by different manufacturers.

Development 

In the 1990s, the American engineer Bill Finnegan sought an overdrive pedal that would recreate the harmonically rich distortion of a guitar amplifier at a high volume. He wanted a "big, open" sound, with a "hint of tube clipping", that would not sound like a pedal was being used. He experimented with the Ibanez Tube Screamer, but was not satisfied. 

With electrical engineer friends, including the MIT graduate Fred Fenning, Finnegan developed prototype pedals in his spare time over four and a half years. After extensive experimentation, he selected germanium diodes for the circuit and purchased as many as he could afford. He coated the components in epoxy resin to make the pedal harder to replicate.

Release 
Finnegan first sold the Klon Centaur in late 1994. He was overwhelmed by demand and worked long hours in his home, building, testing, and shipping the pedals himself. Every part was custom made, including the cast enclosure, knobs and pots. In total, Finnegan built around 8,000 pedals over 15 years. 

As it took Finnegan 12 to 14 weeks to fulfil each order, used Centaur pedals sold for inflated prices; this placed more pressure on Finnegan to meet demand. Finnegan said his profit margin was "not very sensible", and he found it difficult to hire employees and expand the business in Boston, where commercial space was expensive.

In 2008, Finnegan decided the situation was unsustainable and discontinued the Centaur. He declined large requests to make more, but continued to make them for a close friend, a single mother who needed financial support, to sell on eBay.

Legacy 
The Klon Centaur has been used by guitarists including Jeff Beck, John Mayer, Joe Perry, Nels Cline (of Wilco), Matt Schofield and Ed O'Brien (of Radiohead). Finnegan said the pedal attracted a variety of guitarists, including baby boomers, younger indie rock musicians and experimental musicians. Guitarists praised the clear, uncolored tone of the boosted signal. Cline said: "It's an amp in a box. No more worries in the world of 'amp du jour' about overdrive tone. It will be OK. The Centaur will take care of it." 

As of 2019, used Centaurs sold for between $1,900 and $2,500 USD. According to Guitar.com, which named the Centaur one of the greatest effect pedals, "The Klon Centaur is either the greatest, most useful overdrive ever made, or the worst example of guitarists losing all sense of perspective about how much good tone should cost."

Klon KTR 
Finnegan redesigned the Centaur as the Klon KTR, released in 2014. His goal was to create a straightforward design that could be built by a contracted manufacturing firm and would be easy to repair, among other considerations, while preserving the Centaur sound. The Klon KTR took two years to design and sold for $269. It bears the text: "Kindly remember: The ridiculous hype that offends so many is not of my making."

Other pedals 
The Centaur has inspired numerous clones by different manufacturers. Finnegan expressed skepticism that they could replicate the sound, due to factors including the rarity of the Centaur's germanium diodes. He said they damaged his product's reputation and that clones disincentivize engineers from creating innovative products.

In early 2023, Josh Scott, the owner of JHS Pedals, published a YouTube video comparing the Centaur against the DigiTech Bad Monkey Tube Overdrive, a discontinued pedal released in 2004. The video demonstrated no discernible difference in sound. On the online marketplace Reverb.com, listings for Bad Monkey pedals rose to as high as $11,000, up from an average of $50 in January 2023.  Responding to complaints that he had driven the price up, Scott wrote in a statement: “I would like to remind you you had 19 years to buy one, but you never cared ... Learn to listen with your ears and not trends, and you will be a much happier guitarist."

References 

Effects units